Thomas Nelson High School is a public high school located in an unincorporated area of Nelson County, Kentucky that has a Bardstown mailing address. Operated by the Nelson County School District and named after American Revolution figure Thomas Nelson, Jr., it was opened in August 2012 to alleviate overcrowding at what had been the district's only regular high school, Nelson County High School.

Although the school opened in 2012, it did not graduate its first students until 2014. In its first school year of 2012–13, only 9th through 11th grades attended.

Notes and references

Buildings and structures in Bardstown, Kentucky
Educational institutions established in 2012
Public high schools in Kentucky
Schools in Nelson County, Kentucky
2012 establishments in Kentucky